The Pardo River is a river in the state of Pará, Brazil.
It is a left tributary of the Xingu River.

The Pardo River defines the northwest boundary of the   Serra do Pardo National Park, created in 2005.

See also
List of rivers of Pará

References

Sources

Rivers of Pará